Miecze  is a village in the administrative district of Gmina Rajgród, within Grajewo County, Podlaskie Voivodeship, in north-eastern Poland.

The village has an approximate population of 200.

References

Miecze